The  are sand dunes located outside the city center of Tottori in Tottori Prefecture, Japan. The sand dunes are part of San'in Kaigan Geopark, which is part of The UNESCO Global Geoparks.

History 
The sand formations were created when sediment deposits carried from the Chūgoku Mountains by the Sendai River were thrown away into the Sea of Japan. Strong winds then shaped the dunes over a span of 100,000 years.

The area of the dunes has been steadily decreasing due to a government reforestation program following World War II. Concrete barriers have been built along the coast to prevent the formations from eroding. Authorities have adopted measures to stop the shrinkage of the dunes, partly because they attract a significant amount of tourism to the area.

Gallery

See also
Nakatajima Sand Dunes
Sarugamori Sand Dunes
Tourism in Japan

References

External links 

 Tottori Prefecture Guidebook

Articles containing video clips
Dunes of Japan
Natural monuments of Japan
Landforms of Tottori Prefecture
Tourist attractions in Tottori Prefecture